Alligator Creek is a coastal rural locality in the Mackay Region, Queensland, Australia.

Geography
Dudgeon Point is a headland into the Coral Sea at the northernmost tip of the locality.

Mount Hector is a mountain on the Coral Sea coast at the mouth of Louisa Creek.

History
Alligator Creek Provisional School opened on 14 September 1896. On 1 January 1909 it became Alligator State School.

On 17 November 1911, a mother and her five children were murdered in their home at Alligator Creek. The family's farm hand, George David Silva, was convicted of the murder of the mother, and was hanged on 10 June 1912.

Education 
Alligator Creek State School is a government primary (Prep-6) school for boys and girls at 50 Grasstree Road. In 2018, the school had an enrolment of 308 students with 24 teachers (20 full-time equivalent) and 15 non-teaching staff (11 full-time equivalent). It includes a special education program.

There is no secondary school in Alligator Creek. The nearest secondary school is Sarina State High School in neighbouring Sarina to the south.

References

External links
 

Mackay Region
Coastline of Queensland
Localities in Queensland